The 1876 United States presidential election in Georgia took place on November 7, 1876, as part of the wider United States presidential election. Voters chose 11 representatives, or electors, to the electoral college, who voted for president and vice president.

Background
Reconstruction in Georgia ended in 1871.

Vote
The Tilden/Hendricks ticket carried the state by a margin of 44.06 on election day.

Results

References

Further reading
 Hogan, Richard, “Resisting Redemption The Republican Vote in Georgia in 1876,” Social Science History, 35 (Summer 2011), 133–66.

Notes

Georgia
1876
1876 Georgia (U.S. state) elections